Chrysolina marginata is a species of leaf beetle in the family Chrysomelidae.

References

Further reading

External links

 

Chrysomelinae
Articles created by Qbugbot
Beetles described in 1758
Taxa named by Carl Linnaeus